Vincent King Jr. (born January 22, 1997) is an American professional basketball player, who currently plays for the Bristol Flyers of the British Basketball League having previously played for the Westchester Knicks of the NBA G League. He played college basketball for the Louisville Cardinals.

Early life and high school career
King is the son of Lo and Vincent King Sr. When he was in sixth grade at the United Faith Christian Academy, he received his first Division I scholarship offer from Charlotte. Prior to his freshman year of high school, King moved to Akron, Ohio and he attended St. Vincent–St. Mary High School. He became the first freshman to start on the team since LeBron James and he led the Fighting Irish to the state final. As a sophomore, he averaged 17 points per game and was named to the 2013–14 Associated Press Division II All-Ohio First Team alongside teammate Jalen Hudson. King transferred to Paul VI Catholic High School in Fairfax, Virginia prior to his junior year where he was coached by Glenn Farello. He averaged 18.7 points per game as a junior and earned All-Met honors. On the AAU Circuit, King competed for Team Takeover where he averaged 14.2 points and 5.2 rebounds per game in 2015. King scored 35 points in a high school game in December 2015. As a senior, King averaged 22.9 points, 9.6 rebounds, 2.5 assists and 2.1 steals per game. He led the Panthers to a 20–11 record and to the Virginia Independent Schools Athletic Association Division I state championship game. He was a First Team All-Washington Catholic Athletic Conference honoree and was selected as the USA Today Gatorade Virginia Basketball Player of the Year. King was named a McDonald's All American in 2016 and was selected to the Jordan Brand Classic.

King was a five-star recruit ranked No. 27 in his class according to ESPN, while Rivals ranked him No. 11 in the class of 2016. On June 12, 2015, King committed to Louisville, spurning offers from Arizona, UConn and Virginia among others. He cited his relationship with Louisville assistant coach Kenny Johnson, previously an assistant at Paul VI, as crucial in his decision.

College career
On February 6, 2017, King scored a career-high 24 points on 8-of-14 shooting in a loss against Virginia. As a freshman at Louisville, King averaged 5.5 points per game off the bench. He started every game as a sophomore and averaged 8.6 points and 3.3 rebounds per game, shooting 32 percent from three-point range. As a junior, he started five games and averaged 3.9 points and 3.0 rebounds per game. After the season, he announced he was leaving Louisville and entered the 2019 NBA draft.

Professional career
After going undrafted in the 2019 NBA draft, King signed with the New York Knicks. He was waived by the Knicks on October 19, 2019. King joined their G League affiliate, the Westchester Knicks. King played in 13 of the team’s first 15 games then missed roughly a month due to a strained hamstring and knee soreness. He returned to Westchester on January 18, 2020, and on January 31 posted his season high 17 points against the Maine Red Claws. King averaged 4.7 points and 2.3 rebounds in his rookie season.

He was waived on February 1, 2022.

In the summer of 2022 he signed for the Bristol Flyers of the British Basketball League for the 2022/23 season.

National team career
King competed in the 2013 FIBA Under-16 World Championship representing the United States. He helped the team go 5–0, winning the title while averaging 8.2 points and 5.2 rebounds per game.

King competed in the 2014 FIBA Under-17 World Championship representing the United States. He helped the team go 7–0, winning the title while averaging 6.7 points and 2.9 rebounds per game.

Career statistics

NBA G League

Regular season

|-
| style="text-align:left;"| 2019–20
| style="text-align:left;"| Westchester
| 26 || 2 || 11.8 || .398 || .282 || .769 || 2.4 || .6 || .2 || .1 || 4.7
|- class="sortbottom"
| style="text-align:center;" colspan="2"| Career
| 26 || 2 || 11.8 || .398 || .282 || .769 || 2.4 || .6 || .2 || .1 || 4.7

College

|-
| style="text-align:left;"| 2016–17
| style="text-align:left;"| Louisville
| 33 || 7 || 13.5 || .432 || .421 || .821 || 2.1 || .5 || .2 || .1 || 5.5
|-
| style="text-align:left;"| 2017–18
| style="text-align:left;"| Louisville
| 36 || 36 || 25.4 || .398 || .320 || .735 || 3.3 || .9 || .6 || .1 || 8.6
|-
| style="text-align:left;"| 2018–19
| style="text-align:left;"| Louisville
| 32 || 5 || 13.7 || .367 || .114 || .791 || 3.0 || .6 || .2 || .1 || 3.9
|- class="sortbottom"
| style="text-align:center;" colspan="2"| Career
| 101 || 48 || 17.8 || .400 || .297 || .772 || 2.8 || .7 || .3 || .1 || 6.1

References

External links
NBA G League profile
Louisville Cardinals bio
USA Basketball bio

1997 births
Living people
American men's basketball players
Basketball players from Akron, Ohio
Louisville Cardinals men's basketball players
McDonald's High School All-Americans
Shooting guards
Small forwards
St. Vincent–St. Mary High School alumni
Westchester Knicks players
American expatriate basketball people in the United Kingdom
American expatriate sportspeople in England